Elloway is a surname. Notable people with the surname include:

 Kenneth Elloway (1916–1980), British teacher, musician, and conductor
 Rob Elloway (born 1983), German rugby union player

Surnames of Scottish origin
Surnames of Old English origin